William Joseph Gleeson (4 July 1931 – 17 September 1998) was an Australian rules footballer who played with St Kilda in the Victorian Football League (VFL).

Notes

External links 

1931 births
Australian rules footballers from Victoria (Australia)
St Kilda Football Club players
1998 deaths